Peter Engle may refer to:

 Peter Whitney (Peter King Engle, 1916–1972), American actor
 Peter H. Engle, American lawyer and politician in Wisconsin Territory